Protoclythia is a genus of flat-footed flies in the family Platypezidae.

Species
P. californica Kessel, 1950
P. modesta (Zetterstedt, 1844)
P. rufa (Meigen, 1830)

References

Platypezidae
Platypezoidea genera